Aillutticus is a genus of South American jumping spiders that was first described by María Elena Galiano in 1987.

Species
 it contains eight species, found only in Argentina and Brazil:
Aillutticus knysakae Ruiz & Brescovit, 2006 – Brazil
Aillutticus montanus Ruiz & Brescovit, 2006 – Brazil
Aillutticus nitens Galiano, 1987 (type) – Argentina, Brazil
Aillutticus pinquidor Galiano, 1987 – Argentina
Aillutticus raizeri Ruiz & Brescovit, 2006 – Brazil
Aillutticus rotundus Galiano, 1987 – Brazil
Aillutticus soteropolitano Ruiz & Brescovit, 2006 – Brazil
Aillutticus viripotens Ruiz & Brescovit, 2006 – Brazil

References

Sitticini
Salticidae genera
Spiders of Argentina
Spiders of Brazil